St. Louis High School may refer to:

 St. Louis Senior High School (Ghana), Kumasi, Ashanti Region
 St Louis High School, Rathmines, Dublin, Ireland
 St. Louis Catholic High School, Lake Charles, Louisiana, US
 Saint Louis School, Honolulu, Hawaii, US